The Ministry of External Affairs was an agency of the Rhodesian government. It was involved in running the Rhodesian mission in Lisbon and Rhodesia's unofficial embassies in the United States (the Rhodesian Information Office), Australia (the Rhodesia Information Centre) and France.

See also
Ministry of Foreign Affairs (Zimbabwe)

References

External affairs
Rhodesia